Joanne Carol Mulliner (born 18 August 1966) is a female English former athlete.

Athletics career
Mulliner represented Great Britain in the women's heptathlon at the 1988 Seoul Olympics. She achieved her best score of 6094 points on 7 June 1987 in Arles, to become only the fourth British woman to score over 6000 points, after Tessa Sanderson, Judy Simpson and Kim Hagger. As of 2018, she ranks 11th on the UK all-time list. She represented England, at the 1986 Commonwealth Games in Edinburgh, Scotland and represented England, at the 1990 Commonwealth Games in Auckland, New Zealand, where she finished fourth in the heptathlon on both occasions.

International competitions

National titles
AAA Championships (1988, 1990)

References

1966 births
Living people
Athletes (track and field) at the 1988 Summer Olympics
British heptathletes
Olympic athletes of Great Britain
People from Cosford, Shropshire
Athletes (track and field) at the 1986 Commonwealth Games
Athletes (track and field) at the 1990 Commonwealth Games
Commonwealth Games competitors for England